is a Japanese animation studio founded in June 2011 by veteran anime director Hiroshi Negishi. The studio is located in Suginami, Tokyo. 

The studio is separate from Negishi's prior studio Zero-G Room, which was established in 1991 and was later shut down in 2001 when it merged with Radix to become Radix Ace Entertainment.

Works

Television series

ONAs

OVAs

Theatrical films

References

External links

  
 

 
Animation studios in Tokyo
Japanese animation studios
Japanese companies established in 2011
Suginami
Mass media companies established in 2011